Bauri is a surname. Notable people with the surname include:
Amar Kumar Bauri (born 1978), Indian politician
Chandana Bauri (born 1990/1991), Indian politician
Durgadas Bauri (1942–2003), Indian politician
Kalipada Bauri (died 2019), Indian politician
Madan Bauri (minister) (1936–2015), Indian politician
Madan Bauri (MLA), Indian actor
Sandhya Bauri (born 1951), Indian political and social worker
Susmita Bauri (born 1975), Indian politician
Swapan Bauri, Indian politician
Vivekananda Bauri, Indian politician

Hindustani-language surnames
Surnames of Hindustani origin
Bengali-language surnames